A by-election was held for the Australian House of Representatives seat of Ballaarat on 10 July 1920.

At the 1919 federal election, Nationalist candidate Edwin Kerby had defeated the sitting Labor MP, Charles McGrath, by a single vote, the narrowest margin in Australian electoral history. McGrath challenged the result successfully on the grounds of electoral irregularities, triggering the by-election, at which McGrath was victorious.

Results

References

1920 elections in Australia
Victorian federal by-elections
1920s in Victoria (Australia)